The REV Classic was an annual professional one-day road bicycle racing for men. The race was ridden as a UCI 1.2 category race.  In 2017 the race was postponed with the intention of resuming the race in 2018, however that has not occurred.

Winners

References 

UCI Oceania Tour races
Cycle races in New Zealand
Recurring sporting events established in 2006
Men's road bicycle races
Annual sporting events in New Zealand
2006 establishments in New Zealand
Summer events in New Zealand
Recurring sporting events disestablished in 2016